

Common carriers (operating railroads)

Others (assigned to companies or individuals who own railcars, but are not operating railroads)

References
Reporting Marks: A

A